The 1994 Berlin Marathon was the 21st running of the annual marathon race held in Berlin, Germany, held on 25 September 1994. Portugal's António Pinto won the men's race in 2:08:31 hours, while the women's race was won by home athlete Katrin Dörre-Heinig in 2:25:15.

Results

Men

Women

References 

Results
 Results. Association of Road Racing Statisticians. Retrieved 2020-04-02.

External links 
 Official website

1994 in Berlin
Berlin Marathon
Berlin Marathon
Berlin Marathon
Berlin Marathon